Tazrouk is a district in Tamanrasset Province, Algeria. It was named after its capital, Tazrouk. According to the 2008 census, it has a population of 9,036.

Municipalities 
The district is further divided into 2 municipalities:
 Tazrouk
 Idlès

References 

Districts of Tamanrasset Province